Arthur Davies may refer to:

 Arthur Davies (footballer) (1886–1949), Welsh international footballer
 Arthur Davies (politician) (1867–1918), Australian politician
 Arthur Davies (priest) (1878–1966), Anglican Dean of Worcester
 Arthur Davies (swimmer), British swimmer
 Arthur Davies (tenor) (1941–2018), Welsh tenor
 Arthur Bowen Davies (1863–1928), American artist
 Arthur Llewelyn Davies (1863–1907), father of the boys who served as the inspiration for the children of J. M. Barrie's stories of Neverland
 Arthur E. Davies, founder and musical director of the Luton Girls Choir
 Arthur Vernon Davies (1872–1942), Member of Parliament for Royton, 1924–1931

See also
 Arthur Davis (disambiguation)
 Art Davie, entrepreneur
 Arthur Davies Stadium, Kitwe, Zambia
 Davies